Nicolás Federico Femia (born 8 August 1996) is an Argentine professional footballer who plays as an attacking midfielder for Sarmiento.

Career
Femia's senior career got underway with Huracán of the Primera División. He didn't make an appearance in the aforementioned competition, but did play in the Copa Argentina against Central Córdoba (R) on 18 July 2016; a late cameo in a 2–1 win. Two years later, in August 2018, Femia agreed a move to Primera B Metropolitana's Sacachispas. His debut arrived on 17 August versus Barracas Central, as Femia also scored his first goal as they drew 2–2. In total, twenty games and three goals, which included a brace over Deportivo Español, occurred. July 2019 saw Femia join newly promoted Primera División team Central Córdoba.

Femia netted on his top-flight bow versus Atlético Tucumán, as he secured Santiago del Estero's Central Córdoba their first three points in the Primera División for forty-eight years. He appeared just once more for the club, departing in January 2020 to Villa Dálmine of Primera B Nacional. Two appearances followed, prior to the season's curtailment due to the COVID-19 pandemic. On 29 September 2020, Femia completed a move to Bulgarian football with First Professional Football League side Etar; penning a two-year contract. His debut arrived in a 2–2 draw against CSKA Sofia on 4 October. He picked up an injury in training soon after.

Career statistics
.

References

External links

1996 births
Living people
Argentine footballers
Argentine expatriate footballers
Footballers from Buenos Aires
Association football midfielders
Primera B Metropolitana players
Argentine Primera División players
Primera Nacional players
First Professional Football League (Bulgaria) players
Club Atlético Huracán footballers
Sacachispas Fútbol Club players
Central Córdoba de Santiago del Estero footballers
Villa Dálmine footballers
SFC Etar Veliko Tarnovo players
Club Atlético Sarmiento footballers
Expatriate footballers in Bulgaria
Argentine expatriate sportspeople in Bulgaria